Eremiasaurus is a genus of extinct genus of Cretaceous marine lizard belonging to the mosasaur family. It is classified as part of the Mosasaurini tribe (within the Mosasaurinae) and is exclusively known from the Maastrichtian phosphates of the Ouled Abdoun Basin in Morocco. Eremiasaurus means "desert lizard", referring to the arid climate of present-day Morocco where its fossils were recovered.

One species is known, E. heterodontus, whose specific name refers to high degree of heterodonty exhibited compared to other species of mosasaur.

Description 
Eremaiasaurus is known from two specimens UALVP 51744 and OCP DEK/GE 112, both designated as syntype specimens due to the fact that UALVP 51744 lacks precise locality data. Based on observations of these specimens, several distinguishing features can be established that clearly support Eremiasaurus as a distinct genus. The most prominent of these is the high degree of heterodonty and the unusually large number of pygal vertebrae, only Plotosaurus is known to have possessed more pygal vertebrae.

Classification 
An analysis carried out at the time of its description featuring a data matrix of 135 characters and 32 terminal taxa recovered Eremiasaurus heterodontus as a sister taxon to the Plotosaurini, a tribe now seen as synonymous with the Mosasaurini. A close relation to (or even inclusion within) the Mosasaurini is supported by the presence of an internarial bar keel, the exclusion of the prefrontals from the narial borders, narial embayments in the frontal and the presence of a quadrate ala groove.

Eremiasaurus differs from the closely related Mosasaurus and Plotosaurus in having the infrastapedial and suprastapedial processes of the quadrate fused, possessing a very large and rounded stapedial pit, large pterygoid teeth and the glenoid condyle of the humerus being gently domed.

Cladogram of Eremiasaurus and related taxa within the Mosasaurinae modified from D.V. Grigoriev, 2013:

References

Mosasaurines
Mosasaurs of Africa
Fossil taxa described in 2012